Nam Chung is an area in the north eastern New Territories of Hong Kong, west of Luk Keng and to the southwest of the Starling Inlet (Sha Tau Kok Hoi), opposite Sha Tau Kok.

Administration
Nam Chung is a recognized village under the New Territories Small House Policy. It is one of the villages represented within the Sha Tau Kok District Rural Committee. For electoral purposes, Nam Chung is part of the Sha Ta constituency, which is currently represented by Ko Wai-kei.

Villages
Nam Chung Village includes Nam Chung Yeung Uk, Nam Chung Cheng Uk, Nam Chung Law Uk, Nam Chung Cheung Uk and Nam Chung Lei Uk.

History
At the time of the 1911 census, the population of Nam Chung was 348. The number of males was 152.

During the Japanese Occupation of Hong Kong, Nam Chung was the site several events related to the anti-Japanese resistance effort. On March 3, 1943, Nam Chung was the site of the "Three-three incident". Several senior members of the local East River Column, who had been residing there since about a month, were killed during an assault that involved two companies of Japanese soldiers and over fifty Kempeitai. Shortly thereafter, in June 1943, Nam Chung was the first village in the New Territories to form an underground government. At that time, the village had over 200 households and a population of about 1,500.

Conservation
The small island of A Chau, a Site of Special Scientific Interest, is located in the south-western part of Starling Inlet off Nam
Chung.

Transport
The area is linked to Fanling–Sheung Shui New Town and Sha Tau Kok via Sha Tau Kok Road and Luk Keng Road.

See also
 List of villages in Hong Kong

References

External links

 Delineation of area of existing village Nam Chung (Sha Tau Kok) for election of resident representative (2019 to 2022)
 Antiquities Advisory Board. Historic Building Appraisal. Tsing Kun Study Hall No. 22 Lei Uk, Nam Chung Pictures

Populated places in Hong Kong
Sha Tau Kok